Decatur High School (DHS) is a high school in Decatur, Georgia, United States. It is City Schools of Decatur's sole high school and was established in 1912.

Academics

The standard core curriculum at Decatur High School is taught at the college-preparatory level, advanced, and the Advanced Placement level may begin in the 10th grade. Students may also enroll in work-study opportunities or internships, and take joint enrollment classes at local colleges. 87% of the class of 2012 attended a four-year college and 58% met the HOPE Scholarship.

The average scores for the PSAT, the SAT, and the Georgia High School Graduation Test are all above the state averages. 101 students took the ACT, and 149 students took the SAT by the fall 2012 semester. The school met Adequate Yearly Progress for the 2010–2011 school year. Students also have to take the  MAP (Measures of Academic Progress) tests three times every year until their senior year.

The school continues the International Baccalaureate middle years programme started at Renfroe Middle School through the 9th and 10th grades. Sophomores may apply to the Diploma Programme after completion of the middle years programme.

Accomplishments

Academic

2005-2006
Erin Lowe Vickery was named a finalist in the Young Epidemiology Scholars national competition and received a fifteen thousand dollar scholarship

2006-2007
William Slack won first place in the Young Epidemiology Scholars national competition and received a fifty thousand dollar scholarship

2010-2011
Became an AP Honor School and was included in The Washington Posts Challenge Index. 
Five seniors entered the HerWorld competition and won by designing a smart toothbrush.

2021-2022
The DHS Mock Trial Team won the Georgia mock trial state championship

2022-2023
The DHS Boys and Girls Cross County both won the 5A GHSA State Championship respectively. Three runners, Billy Carlton, Gabby Malerba, and Jake Westing are named to the  Atlanta Track Club All-Metro Cross Country Team.

Athletic
Athletic activities include Soccer, Baseball, Basketball, Football, swimming, Cross Country, and a number of other sports.
The Boys Cross Country Team won the Class 5A State Championship in 2019, the school's first State Title in Cross County. On 14, May, 2022 the girls ultimate frisbee team won the state girls ultimate frisbee championship, ending their season undefeated.

Controversies

2020-2022 Racial Discrimination Controversy
In may of 2020 a video began circulating showing a DHS student, and son of DHS IB coordinator and instructional coach Cheryl Nahamias, holding a toy gun , using racial slurs and threatening black DHS students. Cheryl Nahamias was demoted and reassigned to a job in CSD's central offices after defending her sons actions. In December of 2020 Cheryl Nahamias, who is white, filed a racial discrimination suit against City Schools of Decatur, stating through her attorney that "[I] believe the City Schools of Decatur has violated Dr. Nahmias' civil, constitutional, and educational privacy rights. We intend to prove that [Superintendent David] Dude and his administration have created a work environment that is hostile to legally protected speech and whistleblowers. ... We intend to hold CSD and its administrators accountable for this egregious conduct.". In January of 2022 it was reported that CSD settled with Cheryl Nahamias out of court and agreed to pay her three hundred and fifty thousand dollars.

Football Spectator Misconduct
At a Football game played in late August 2022 against Flowery Branch High School Decatur High School students spat on members of the Flowery Branch High School band, pulled feathers from the hats of members of the FBHS band and sexually harassed the FBHS majorettes. additionally students from DHS consumed alcohol and drugs, got into fights and vandalized the stadium. These events resulted in DHS implementing a new suite of policies intended to curb student misconduct at sporting events; including banning students from standing, increasing supervision of the event by members of the school staff and disallowing students from bringing bags into stadiums.

Notable alumni
Roy Blount, Jr., writer and humorist
Pete Case, former professional football player
Felipe Claybrooks, former professional football player
DeForest Kelley, actor
Gorden Kelley, former professional football player
Larry Morris, former professional football player, College Football Hall of Fame member
Morgan Saylor, Actress, Homeland
David Sims, former professional football player
Jordan Walker, professional baseball player
Herb White, former professional basketball player
Daniel Wilcox, former professional football player

References

External links
 Decatur High School

Public high schools in DeKalb County, Georgia
Educational institutions established in 1912
Decatur, Georgia
1912 establishments in Georgia (U.S. state)